Fibras Industriales S.A. - FISA, is the largest multi-filament fishing net manufacturer in the western hemisphere. Founded in 1943, FISA has more than 75 years of experience in the market, developing products for use in purse seine fishing, trawling, long line fishing, gillnet fishing, aquaculture, predator netting, security netting, sports netting and bird netting.

FISAs main plant is located in Lima, Peru and there are commercial offices in Puerto Montt, Chile to attend the local salmon farm industry and in Chimbote, Peru to attend a large sector of the fishing industry in this, Peru's main fishing port.

During 2006, FISA inaugurated a state-of-the-art woven plastic sacks manufacturing plant with the latest machinery from Starlinger, Austria and this plant was subsequently sold to Grupo Fierro during 2011.

Currently, FISA is a main supplier for Tilapia farms in Central America and Africa including Mexico, Honduras, Ghana, Uganda, Kenya, Zambia and more.

External links
Official site

Fishing equipment manufacturers
Manufacturing companies of Peru